Wilson Law (26 February 1806 – 15 October 1876) was an early Latter Day Saint.

Life
He was born in Ireland and emigrated with his family to the United States in 1820. He joined the Church of Jesus Christ of Latter Day Saints in the late 1830s. His younger brother, William Law, had joined the church a few years earlier.

Nauvoo Expositor and Death of Joseph Smith

In 1844, Wilson Law supported his brother in criticizing church founder Joseph Smith and was excommunicated on 18 April 1844. With William, he subsequently became a publisher of the Nauvoo Expositor, a paper critical of Smith. The Nauvoo City Council ordered the press destroyed, ultimately resulting in Joseph Smith's arrest and death.

Later life
Law died in Shullsburg, Wisconsin in 1876.

References

1806 births
1876 deaths
Converts to Mormonism
Irish emigrants to the United States (before 1923)
Irish Latter Day Saints
People excommunicated by the Church of Christ (Latter Day Saints)
People from Nauvoo, Illinois
Nauvoo Expositor publishers
19th-century American journalists
American male journalists